Marion Winik is a journalist and author, best known for her work on NPR's All Things Considered.

Early life and education 
Winik was born in Manhattan in 1958 and grew up on the Jersey shore. She graduated from Brown University in 1978, majoring in History and Semiotics, and received her MFA from Brooklyn College in 1983.

Notable works 
In her childhood and early twenties, Winik focused on writing poetry, publishing two collections, Nonstop and Boycrazy. Winik then began writing personal essays, which were published in The Austin Chronicle. These essays caught John Burnett's eye, who was an NPR reporter based in Austin, Texas at the time. He suggested that Winik work as a commentator for All Things Considered and her first piece was published there in 1991. The following year, a literary agent contact her, resulting in the 1994 publication of Telling, a collection of Winik's essays.

A couple of years later in 1996, Winik published First Comes Love, a memoir about her marriage to Tony, who died of AIDS in 1994. In her review of the book in the New York Times, Daphne Merkin wrote, "Marion Winik is resilient, hardy, unfazable; this self-described "suburban boho wannabe" is a frontier woman in disguise."

A professor in the MFA program at the University of Baltimore since 2007, Winik writes "Bohemian Rhapsody," a monthly column at Baltimore Fishbowl.com. She is a board member of the National Book Critics Circle and reviews books for People, Newsday, The Washington Post, and Kirkus Reviews; she hosts The Weekly Reader podcast at WYPR. Her honors include an NEA Fellowship in Creative Nonfiction and the 2019 Towson Prize for literature. More info at marionwinik.com.

Bibliography
ABOVE US ONLY SKY (Counterpoint, 2020; Seal Press, 2005)
THE BIG BOOK OF THE DEAD (Counterpoint, 2019)  
THE BALTIMORE BOOK OF THE DEAD (Counterpoint, 2018)
HIGHS IN THE LOW FIFTIES (Globe Pequot Press, 2013)
THE GLEN ROCK BOOK OF THE DEAD (Counterpoint, 2008)
RULES FOR THE UNRULY (Simon and Schuster, 2001)
THE LUNCH-BOX CHRONICLES (Villard, 1998) 
FIRST COMES LOVE (Pantheon, 1996)
TELLING (Villard, 1994)
BOYCRAZY (Slough Press, 1985)
NONSTOP (Cedar Rock, 1981)

References

Living people
1958 births
People from Manhattan
Brown University alumni
Brooklyn College alumni
NPR personalities
20th-century American journalists
21st-century American journalists